Schepisi is a surname. Notable people with the surname include:

Alexandra Schepisi, Australian actress
Fred Schepisi (born 1939), Australian film director, producer, and screenwriter
Holly Schepisi (born 1971), American lawyer, businesswoman, and politician
Mary Schepisi (born 1949), American artist